The Plavitsa is a river that flows within the basin of the river Don in Voronezh Oblast, Lipetsk Oblast and Tambov Oblast, Russia. The Plavitsa is a left tributary of the Matyra.

References

Rivers of Voronezh Oblast
Rivers of Tambov Oblast
Rivers of Lipetsk Oblast